Britain's Got Talent: The Champions is a spin-off of Britain's Got Talent, a British talent competition series, which began broadcasting on ITV on 31 August 2019. The programme functions similar to BGT, but features a selection of participants - winners, finalists and other notable acts - from across the history of both Britain's Got Talent and the Got Talent franchise, who compete in a series of preliminaries to secure a place in the grand final and a chance to win a large prize and to be crowned Britain's champion within Got Talent.
 
The spin-off is hosted by Anthony McPartlin and Declan Donnelly (colloquially known as Ant & Dec), and is based upon America's Got Talent: The Champions, in that the format is different to the main programme - episodes are pre-recorded, and votes for participants are conducted under a different system. The spin-off series averaged 5.84 million viewers across the 6 episodes during its broadcast.

Presenters/Judges

Production
Following the success of America's Got Talent: The Champions in early 2019, Simon Cowell opted to create a similar spin-off competition for Britain's Got Talent, which, along with the same subtitle, would operate under the same format. Production was green-lighted by the broadcaster ITV, with the contest taking place between July and August of the same year, and using the same presenters and panel of judges as the regular show. Much like the American spin-off, the episodes were pre-recorded – filming of the spin-off took place during the contest's operation, with production staff editing the finalised footage for full broadcast over a weekly basis, towards the end of the Summer TV schedule that year.

Contest overview
Around 45 participants from across the Got Talent franchise, ranging from winners, live round participants – both quarter-finalists (where applicable) and semi-finalists – and other notable acts, participated during The Champions contest in 2019, with each of the contest's preliminaries featuring around 9 participants. The following table lists each participants that took part, their history in the Got Talent franchise – per respective international version, series, and performance – and their overall result in the contest:

 |  | 
 |   |  Golden Buzzer

{| class="sortable wikitable" style="margin-left: auto; margin-right: auto; border: none; text-align:center; width:85%; font-size:90%"
|-
! style="width:12%;" | Participant
! style="width:12%;"class="unsortable" | Act
! style="width:25%;" class="unsortable" | Got Talent history
! style="width:5%;" | Preliminary
! style="width:10%;" | Results
|-
| 100 Voices of Gospel
| Gospel Choir
|BGT: 10 - Finalist
| 2
| 
|-
| Alexandr Magala
| Sword Swallower
| AGT: S8 - Quarter-finalist ; IGT: S5 - Finalist ; MS: S8 - Winner ; UMT: S6 - Semi-finalist ; FIT: S9 - Participant ; BGT: S10 - Finalist ; ČSMT: S6 - Semi-finalist; AGTC : S1 - Participant; AuGT S9 - Participant
| 5
| 
|-bgcolor="navajowhite"
| Alexa Lauenburger 
| Dog Tricks Act
| DS: S11 - Winner| 2| |-
| Antonio Sorgentone
| Singer & Pianist
| IGT: S9 - Winner
| 2
| 
|-
| Ashleigh & Sully
| Dancing Dog Act
| BGT: S6 - Winner ; AGTC : S1 - Participant
| 1
| 
|-
| Bad Salsa
| Salsa Dancers
| InGT: S4 - Winner
| 1
| 
|-bgcolor="navajowhite"
| Bars & Melody| Rapper & Singer| BGT: S8 - Third Place|5| |-bgcolor="navajowhite"
| Bello & Annaliese Nock| Comic Daredevils| AGT: S12 - Quarter-finalist (Bello), S13 - Participant (Annaliese)| 1| |- 
| Ben Hart
| Magician
| BGT: S13 - Third Place
| 5
| 
|-
| Billy & Emily England
| Extreme Rollerskating Duo
| BGT: S9 - Semi-finalist ; AGT: S12 - Semifinalist; AGTC : S1 - Participant
| 4
| 
|-
| Bonnie Anderson
| Singer
| AuGT: S1 - Winner
| 4
| 
|-
| Boogie Storm
| Dance Group
| BGT: S10 - Third Place
| 1
| 
|-
| Colin Thackery
| Singer
| BGT: S13 - Winner
| 4
| 
|-
| Collabro
| Musical Theatre Group
| BGT: S8 - Winner
| 5
| 
|-
| Connie Talbot
| Singer
| BGT: S1 - Second Place
| 1
| 
|-
| Cristina Ramos
| Opera & Rock Singer
| GTE: S1 - Winner ; AGTC : S1 - Grand-finalist
| 3
| 
|-
| Daliso Chaponda
| Comedian
| BGT: S11 - Third Place
| 5
| 
|-bgcolor="navajowhite"
| Darcy Oake| Illusionist| BGT: S8 - Finalist ; AGTC : S1 - Participant| 3| |-
| Deadly Games 
| Extreme Knife Throwers
| AGT: S11 - Semi-finalist ; FIT: S12 - Semi-Finalist ; AGTC : S1 - Top 12 Finalist
| 2
| 
|-
| DJ Arch Jnr
| DJ
| SAGT: S6 - Winner ; AGTC : S1 - Participant
| 3
| 
|-
| DM-X Comvaleñoz
| Dance Group
| PGT: S5 - Semi Finalist ; AsGT : S2 - Runner Up
| 5
| 
|-
| Gao Lin & Liu Xin
| Acrobatic Duo
| BGT: S11 - Participant ; AsGT : S1 - Finalist
| 2
| 
|-
| Gennady Tkachenko-Papizh
| Vocalist
| GGT - Participant; UMT: S6 - Finalist ; DS: S12 - Finalist
| 5
| 
|-
| George Sampson
| Breakdancer
| BGT: S2 - Winner
| 4
| 
|-
| Issy Simpson
| Magician
| BGT: S11 - Runner-up ;  AGTC : S1 - Participant
| 4
| 
|-
| Jack Carroll
| Comedian
| BGT: S7 - Runner Up
| 3
| 
|-
| Jai McDowall
| Singer
| BGT: S5 - Winner
| 2
| 
|- bgcolor="#c96"
| Kseniya Simonova 
| Sand Artist
| UMT: S1 - Winner ; AGTC : S1 - Third Place| 1| |-
| Lost Voice Guy
| Comedian
| BGT: S12 - Winner ; AGTC : S1 - Participant
| 2
| 
|-
| Mayyas
| Dance Group
| ArGT: S6 - Winner
| 3
| 
|-bgcolor="navajowhite"
| MerseyGirls| Dance Group| BGT: S11 - Finalist| 2| |-
| Mirror Family
| Dance Group
| ČSMT: S5 - Finalist
| 4
| 
|-bgcolor="navajowhite"
| Paddy & Nico 
| Salsa Dancers| BGT: S8 - Finalist ; FIT: S11 - Semi-finalist| 3| |-
| Paul Potts
| Opera Singer
| BGT: S1 - Winner ; AGTC : S1 - Top 12 Finalist
| 1
| 
|-
| Paul Zerdin
| Ventriloquist
| AGT: S10 - Winner ; AGTC : S1 - Participant
| 2
| 
|-bgcolor="navajowhite"
| Preacher Lawson| Comedian| AGT: S12 - Finalist ; AGTC : S1 - Grand-finalist| 4| |-
| Richard & Adam
| Singing Duet
| BGT: S7 - Third Place
| 3
| 
|-
| Richard Jones
| Close-up Magician
| BGT: S10 - Winner
| 3
| 
|-bgcolor="silver"
| Stavros Flatley 
| Comic Dance Duo| BGT: S3 - Finalist| 4| |-
| Tape Face
| Mime
| AGT: S11 - Finalist ; AGTC : S1 - Participant
| 4
| 
|-
| The Fire
| Dance Troupe
| HGT: S9 - Winner
| 3
| 
|-
| The Nelson Twins
| Comedians
| AuGT: S6 - Finalist
| 1
| 
|-
| The Sacred Riana
| Illusionist
| AsGT : S2 - Winner ; AGT: S13 - Quarter-finalist
| 1
| 
|-bgcolor="gold"
|Twist and Pulse 
|Comic Dance Duo|BGT: S4 - Runner-up|5| '|-
| Vicki Barbolak
| Comedian
|AGT: S13 - Finalist ; AGTC : S1 - Participant
| 5
| 
|}

  The original couple for Deadly Games split up after their last performance together. While the knife-thrower remained to continue under this name, their partner was replaced by the winner of the 8th series of Poland's Got Talent'' for this contest.

Preliminaries
 |  | 
 |  |  Buzzed Out

Preliminaries 1 (31 August)

Preliminaries 2 (7 September)

Preliminaries 3 (14 September)

Preliminaries 4 (21 September)

Preliminaries 5  (28 September)

Grand Final (5 October)

 |  |  | Finalist

Ratings

Notes 
  The ratings over a 7-day period, including the broadcasts on ITV and streaming through ITV Hub using BARB's four-screen dashboard system (includes viewers watching on tablets/smartphones).

References

Ant & Dec
2010s British reality television series
2019 British television series debuts
2019 British television series endings
Britain's Got Talent
British television spin-offs
Reality television spin-offs
English-language television shows
ITV reality television shows
Television series by Fremantle (company)
Television shows produced by Thames Television